Ōmori is a district in Tokyo, Japan.

Ōmori or Omori may also refer to:

Ōmori (surname), a Japanese surname
Ōmori, Akita, a former town in Hiraka District, Akita Prefecture, Japan
Ōmori Station (disambiguation), multiple railway station in Japan
Omori (video game), a 2020 role-playing video game
Ōmori is part of a rural settlement in New Zealand along with Pukawa and Oreti Village.